The Feminine Touch is a 1956 colour British drama film directed by Pat Jackson and starring George Baker, Belinda Lee and Delphi Lawrence. The film is based on the bestselling novel A Lamp Is Heavy by Canadian former nurse Sheila Mackay Russell, and consequently it was released as A Lamp Is Heavy in Canada, while it was given the title The Gentle Touch in the United States, when it was released there in December 1957.

Plot
The film follows five very different student nurses during their first year of training at an NHS hospital in London called St. Augustine's Hospital (filmed at Guy's Hospital), where they live in a dormitory. However, of the five, the main focus is Susan.

Susan (Belinda Lee) is reliable and sensible; Pat (Delphi Lawrence) is flighty and open; Maureen (Adrienne Corri) is Irish and loud; Ann (Henryetta Edwards) is a former public school girl; and Liz (Barbara Archer) comes from a working class background. As they get to know each other, they bond in spite of their differences.

Susan falls in love with Dr Jim Alcott. She is tempted to leave nursing to go with Jim to Canada but decides not to go after helping a patient who tried to commit suicide. However, after a talk with Matron, she decides to join Jim in Canada.

Mandy Miller plays a young patient with a heart condition, convinced that she is going to die.

When it is revealed that one of the group stayed out all night to be with one of the doctors she faces instant dismissal until it is revealed that she has been married for a month. Although also against the rules the nurses philosophise with the matron that this is more admirable than the nurses sneaking out to have affairs: which is tolerated by the system.

Main cast

 George Baker – Dr Jim Alcott
 Belinda Lee – Susan Richards
 Delphi Lawrence – Pat Martin
 Adrienne Corri – Maureen O'Brien
 Henryetta Edwards – Ann Bowland
 Barbara Archer – Liz Jenkins
 Diana Wynyard – Matron
 Joan Haythorne – Home Sister
 Beatrice Varley – Sister Snow
 Constance Fraser – Assistant Matron
 Vivienne Drummond – Second-Year Nurse
 Christopher Rhodes – Dr Ted Russell
 Richard Leech – Casualty doctor
 Newton Blick – Lofty
 Dandy Nichols – Ward Maid
 Mark Daly – Gardener
 Mandy Miller – Jessie
 Dorothy Alison – The suicide
 Joss Ambler – Mr Bateman

Production
The film was based on a 1950 book, The Lamp is Heavy by Sheila Russell. Russell was from Canada, and worked as a nurse in Edmonton. She married a doctor in 1947. The novel was published in the Commonwealth in 1954. It sold 75,000 copies over five years. Russell later wrote another novel called The Living Earth (1954).

Michael Balcon of Ealing wanted to make a hospital film but Sir John Davis of Rank was reluctant; eventually Balcon managed to get approval for this movie.

It was the first Ealing movie directed by Pat Jackson, who had previously made an earlier film about nursing, White Corridors (1951). It was one of the last pair of films made at Ealing Studios, which had been sold to the BBC, and one of the last Ealing movies under the nine-year relationship between Rank and Ealing. (Ealing would move to MGM studios, make several more movies, then be wound up.)

It was an early star role for Belinda Lee. It was one of several "sensible girl" parts she played for Rank. Dorothy Alison was an Australian actor.

Film rights were bought by Rank in early 1955. Filming began in late June 1955 at Pinewood Studios. There was location work at Guy's Hospital. "I'm not surprised that there is a change in title", said Russell. "After all, in England the 'lamp' is still pretty heavy for nurses."

Reception
Variety called it "worthwhile, and as a piece of romantic entertainment, it is more than adequate. Pic has valuable exploitation angles which should help returns in the domestic market... yarn has few comedy touches as well as strong dramatic angles... Cast is competent .without being standout. Miss Lee, a handsome blonde, is rapidly improving as an actress."

The Monthly Film Bulletin said "this latest example of nurse recruitment by film adds little to what has been said by previous productions of this kind."

The Observer said it was "not very good drama, I'm afraid."

References

External links
 
 
 
 
 
 The Feminine Touch at Letterbox DVD
 
 Dr Keith M Johnston, 4 November 2011: The Feminine Touch (1956) – film review from a hospital staffer perspective

1956 films
1956 drama films
British drama films
Films about nurses
Films directed by Pat Jackson
Films scored by Clifton Parker
1950s English-language films
1950s British films